The American South Conference was an NCAA Division I athletic conference that existed from 1987–88 to 1990–91.  The charter members were Arkansas State University, Lamar University, Louisiana Tech University, the University of New Orleans, the University of Southwestern Louisiana (now known as the University of Louisiana at Lafayette) and the University of Texas–Pan American (now merged into the University of Texas Rio Grande Valley). The University of Central Florida (UCF) became the only expansion school during the conference's final academic season before merging with the Sun Belt Conference.  The Sun Belt, which was losing all but three members, merged with the American South conference.  The combined conference retained the name of the older Sun Belt Conference.  Craig Thompson, the American South's first and only commissioner, became commissioner of the merged Sun Belt.  After serving as Sun Belt commissioner for eight years, he became commissioner of the newly formed Mountain West Conference in 1998.

In its brief existence, the American South was home to the 1988 NCAA Division I Women's Basketball Champion in Louisiana Tech, and also had two men's basketball teams earn NCAA at-large berths, Louisiana Tech in 1989 (defeated LaSalle in NCAA 1st Round) and New Orleans in 1991.  Lamar's women's basketball team advanced to the NCAA round of eight in 1991 defeating Texas, LSU, and Arkansas before losing to tournament finalist Virginia.

Member schools

Final members

Notes

Membership timeline

Champions

Men's basketball

Regular season
1988 Louisiana Tech, New Orleans
1989 New Orleans
1990 Louisiana Tech, New Orleans
1991 Arkansas State, New Orleans

Conference tournament

1988 Louisiana Tech
1989 Louisiana Tech
1990 New Orleans
1991 Louisiana Tech

Women's basketball

Regular season
1988 Louisiana Tech
1989 Louisiana Tech
1990 Louisiana Tech
1991 Lamar

Conference tournament
1988 Louisiana Tech
1989 Louisiana Tech
1990 Louisiana Tech
1991 Louisiana Tech

Baseball

Regular season
1988 New Orleans 
1989 Southwestern Louisiana
1990 Southwestern Louisiana
1991 Southwestern Louisiana

Conference tournament
1988 Southwestern Louisiana
1989 New Orleans 
1990 Southwestern Louisiana
1991 Southwestern Louisiana

See also
American South Conference Men's Basketball Player of the Year

References
http://www.ncaapublications.com/productdownloads/BK07.pdf
https://web.archive.org/web/20110107153755/http://www.sports-reference.com/cbb/conferences/AMSO/

Notes

 
Sports in the Southern United States
Defunct NCAA Division I conferences
Sports leagues established in 1987
Sports leagues disestablished in 1991
1987 establishments in the United States
1991 disestablishments in the United States